Mount Tenakourou (also spelled Ténakourou, Tena Kourou or Téna Kourou) is the highest point in Burkina Faso. It is a hill situated on the border of the Cascades Region of Burkina Faso and the Sikasso Region of the country of Mali, not far from the source of the Black Volta. The hill is part of Burkina Faso's South-Western Paleozoic sandstone massif and was formed through the incline of the country's Central Plateau.

Other nearby towns are Orodara in Burkina Faso and Loulouni in Mali. In 1974, the French erected a pile of stones on the summit to raise its elevation to 750 metres. Between 2003 and 2005, the National Tourism Office of Burkina Faso organised a series of high-profile climbs of the hill to raise its touristic potential.

The name Tenakourou signifies "the hill of Tena" in Dyula language. Tena is the name of the village of around 600 inhabitants that lies at the foot of the peak, surrounded by scrubland. Its name means "have a seat here". The village has a mosque and a school, and sometimes hosts an Arts Festival.

Although the area is considered a hotspot of plant diversity, it is still relatively neglected in terms of scientific research. Some of the species found are:

Species of the fungus genus Scleroderma have also been identified.

References

Mountains of Burkina Faso
Mountains of Mali
Burkina Faso–Mali border
International mountains of Africa
Highest points of countries